The red-shouldered macaw (Diopsittaca nobilis) is a small green South American parrot, a member of a large group of Neotropical parrots called macaws. The species is named for the red coverts on its wings. It is the smallest macaw, being  in length - similar in size to the Aratinga parakeets. It is native to the tropical lowlands, savannah, and swamplands of Brazil, the Guianas, Bolivia, Venezuela, and far south-eastern Peru. It has two distinct subspecies, the noble macaw and the Hahn's macaw, and a possible poorly distinct third subspecies that has longer wings, but is otherwise similar to the noble macaw. The Hahn's subspecies is named for German zoologist Carl-Wilhelm Hahn, who in 1834 began compiling Ornithologischer Atlas oder naturgetreue Abbildung und Beschreibung der aussereuropäischen Vögel (Engl: Ornithological Atlas or natural depiction and description of birds from outside Europe).

Red-shouldered macaws are frequently bred in captivity for the pet trade, where they are sometimes described as mini-macaws.

Though wild populations of red-shouldered macaws have declined locally due to habitat loss, they are listed as Least Concern by IUCN. They are listed on Appendix II of CITES, trade restricted.

Taxonomy
The red-shouldered macaw was formally described in 1758 by the Swedish naturalist Carl Linnaeusin the tenth edition of his Systema Naturae. He placed it with all the other parrots in the genus Psittacus and coined the binomial name Psittacus nobilis. The red-shouldered macaw is now the only species placed in the genus Diopsittaca that was introduced in 1912 by the American ornithologist Robert Ridgway. The genus name combines the Ancient Greek dios meaning "noble" with psittakē meaning "parrot". The specific epithet noblilis is Latin meaning "noble". There are two distinct subspecies, D. n. nobilis (Hahn's macaw) and D. n. cumanensis (noble macaw), and some with longer wings might represent a poorly differentiated subspecies, D. n. longipennis, which intergrades with D. n. cumanensis in central Goiás, Brazil. The species is sometimes subsumed into the genus Ara.

Taxonomy proposed by BirdLife International splits the red-shouldered macaw into two species.

 Northern red-shouldered macaw (Diopsittaca nobilis)
 Southern red-shouldered macaw (Diopsittaca cumanensis)

Description
Like all macaws, it has a long narrow tail and a large head. It has bright green feathers on the body, with dark or slate blue feathers on the head just above the beak. The wings and tail have feathers that are bright green above and olive-green below. The leading edges of the wings, especially on the underside, are red. (These red feathers appear at puberty.) Their eyes are orange, and the skin around the eyes is white without feathers, just as in the larger macaws. This bare patch of facial skin is smaller in proportion to the head than the one seen in most larger macaws. The Hahn's macaw and noble macaw can be distinguished by the Hahn's having a black upper mandible and the Noble's having a lighter, horn-colored upper mandible.

Their natural vocalizations are more akin to screeches than they are to whistles.

Behavior
Red-shouldered macaws are very kind natured. Their personality is similar to the large macaws.

Breeding

The red-shouldered macaw nests in a hole in a tree. There are usually three or four white eggs in a clutch. The female incubates the eggs for about 24 to 26 days, and the chicks fledge from the nest about 54 days after hatching.

Aviculture
Although a noisy bird that is not suitable for apartment living, the red-shouldered macaw can be an excellent pet. If properly socialized, it is typically a gentle, intelligent bird that bonds well with humans and gets on well with well-behaved children. In addition, it is an excellent talker that can be taught many tricks. It may be a more suitable pet parrot for those who lack the space in their homes for a larger macaw, although it requires daily exercise outside of its cage. It is also recommended by the World Parrot Trust that this parrot should have access to an outside enclosure for at least part of the year. The red-shouldered macaw can live for 25-40 years in captivity.

Gallery

References

Cited texts

External links

AvianWeb - Macaw conservation status
Explanation of CITES bird regulations

Arini (tribe)
Macaws
Birds of South America
Birds of Brazil
Birds of Bolivia
Birds of Peru
Birds of Venezuela
Birds of the Guianas
Birds of the Cerrado
Birds of the Pantanal
Talking birds
Birds described in 1758
Taxa named by Carl Linnaeus